Levine Children's Hospital is a 234-bed pediatric hospital located on the campus of Carolinas Medical Center in Charlotte, North Carolina. Operated by Atrium Health, hospital opened its doors in October 2007. It is named after  Leon Levine. The hospital has a Pediatric Cardiovascular ICU that can serve up to 4 open heart surgeries a day. The 20 bed unit is shared with a 10-bed Pediatric ICU. The PICU can overflow to 14 beds for additional patient care. Levine Children's Hospital has its own emergency department that can handle simple bumps and bruises to asthma attacks to pediatric traumas.

Levine Children's Hospital also has a café, The X-Ray Café, and a gift shop on the main floor. An outdoor dining area is also available with a nice relaxing view for families, patients, and staff. Each floor of the hospital has its own theme and a relaxation room for families with free coffee and High Definition TV. The Carolina Panthers and Charlotte Knights visit the children often, as do celebrities when in town.

References

External links 
 official website

Hospital buildings completed in 2007
Atrium Health
Children's hospitals in the United States
Hospitals in Charlotte, North Carolina
Hospitals in North Carolina
Pediatric trauma centers